Raul Roulien (born Raul Salvador Intini Pepe; October 8, 1905 – October 8, 2000) was a Brazilian actor, singer, screenwriter and film director. He is widely considered the first male Brazilian star in Hollywood.

He worked briefly in Hollywood in the waning days of the American movies' embrace of the "Latin lover" (a title invented for the Italian actor Rudolph Valentino), a phenomenon that encouraged the Jewish-American actor Jacob Krantz to change his name to Ricardo Cortez. 

Raul began recording in 1928 and grew in reputation as a theater actor and composer as well, being the greatest Brazilian heartthrob of his time. That same year, he formed the theatrical company Abgail Maia-Raul Roulien, with then wife, actress Abgail Maia, authoring a genre called "frivolity theater", which were quick shows that took place between breaks in the cinema.

In 1931, at the age of 29, with his talent and good looks, he went to the United States and was signed to 20th Century Fox, where he worked between 1931 and 1934. His career spanned a total of 18 films, including Delicious (1931) and Flying Down to Rio (1933), the latter starring Fred Astaire and Ginger Rogers in their first dance together.

In 1933 his second wife, Tosca Izabel, was hit and killed as a pedestrian on Sunset Boulevard by John Huston.

Life and career
Raul Roulien was born Raul Salvador Intini Pepe on October 8, 1905, in Rio de Janeiro, Brazil to Italian immigrants Biagio Pepe and Anna Intini. As a child, he used to sing all the time. He started his artistic career at age eight, as Raul Pepe, and he is reported to have performed to then President of Brazil Rodrigues Alves and to Brazilian writer, and his godfather, Ruy Barbosa. 

While visiting one of his brothers in Buenos Aires, Argentina, he was hired to sing at Cine Porteño. There, he rose to fame as a chansonier, a pianist and a composer, and began to pursue a career in the theater. In 1928, back in Brazil, he founded the "Abgail Maya-Raul Roulien Theater Company", with then wife, actress Abgail Maia, and created a performance genre called "Theater of Frivolity," which were quick shows that took place between movie sessions.

In 1931, divorced from Abgail, he went to New York and was signed to 20th Century Fox, as an actor, where he worked until 1934. He made his debut in a Spanish-language version of the 1931 Hollywood film Charlie Chan Carries On, called There Were Thirteen (1931). His second movie was Delicious (1931), directed by David Butler, where Roulien played a Russian composer, and sang "Delishious", written by George Gershwin. In 1932, he starred in Careless Lady, State's Attorney, and The Painted Woman; and in 1933, in No Dejes la Puerta Abierta, El Último Varon Sobre La Tierra, and It's Great to Be Alive. That same year, he starred in the movie for which he is best remembered, Flying Down to Rio, as part of a romantic triangle with Gene Raymond and Dolores del Río, and for singing "Orchids in the Moonlight". The production is also memorable for featuring the first Fred Astaire/Ginger Rogers cinematic pairing.

Stage and film work

Films

Stage

References

Bibliography 
 Aubrey Solomon. The Fox Film Corporation, 1915-1935: A History and Filmography. McFarland, 2011.

External links 
 

1905 births
2000 deaths
Brazilian film directors
Brazilian male film actors
Male actors from Rio de Janeiro (city)
Brazilian expatriates in the United States